Meg: A Novel of Deep Terror is a techno-thriller novel by Steve Alten, and was first published in July 1997. Along with its sequels, the novel follows the underwater adventures of a Navy deep-sea diver named Jonas Taylor. In 2018, a film adaptation titled The Meg, was released. A revised and expanded version of the novel (also containing the prequel Meg: Origins) was also released to coincide with the film's debut. A graphic novel adaptation was also released in 2019 by Steve Alten, J.S. Earls, and Mike Miller.

Plot summary (Revised and Expanded Edition)
In the novel's prologue, during the Late Cretaceous Period, a Tyrannosaurus rex stumbles into the ocean while pursuing a herd of Shantungosaurus and is promptly attacked and devoured by a megalodon. The sequence is later revealed to be part of a slideshow by Jonas Taylor, a paleontologist and marine biologist, for his presentation on megalodon.

In 1997, Jonas was working deep in the Mariana Trench with the United States Navy. His mission is top secret and involves the study of hydrogen nodules to solve any future energy crises using nuclear fission, but unfortunately, it was his third dive in eight days, and he was exhausted yet was checked out by the Navy's top medical officer Doctor Heller. While on the dive, Jonas watches in horror as a megalodon rises from the depths. Jonas panics and surfaces as fast as possible and escapes, but causes the death of the scientists as a result; unfortunately, the Navy does not believe his claims, labeling him a madman and ruining his career while simultaneously covering up the misjudgment of the medical officer. Years later, Jonas continues to try to prove that what he saw was real. His actions have also led Jonas to push away his estranged and separated wife, Maggie, and lead to her having an affair with his billionaire friend Bud Harris. He is later approached by an old friend, marine biologist Masao Tanaka, who lost a remote submersible that monitors seismic activity in the Mariana Trench and hopes to retrieve it. Seeing this as an opportunity to prove that the megalodon still exists, Jonas agrees to help Tanaka over the objection of Tanaka's daughter, Terry.

Jonas and Tanaka's son, DJ, dive in small submersibles when they arrive at the Trench. A male megalodon rises from the depths and, despite Jonas' attempts to distract the creature, kills DJ. Jonas watches in horror as the megalodon is trapped in the steel cables connecting DJ's sub to the ship. As the megalodon is pulled to the surface, having its organs and flesh ripped apart by the cables, Jonas watches a second megalodon, a much larger female attracted by the struggles of her dying mate, rise out of the Trench. She attacks the male and feeds on him as he is pulled to the surface, his heated blood protecting her from the cold water layer that has previously kept them from entering the ocean.

Jonas and Tanaka are worried about the imbalance in the ocean's ecosystem that might result from the re-introduction of a megalodon after an absence of millions of years as Jonas and Tanaka try to track down the megalodon. The female surfaces off the coast of Maui and kills several surfers. She also attacks a helicopter that Jonas uses to try and track her at night after discovering that thousands of years of living in the depths of the Trench has led the sharks to develop bioluminescent white hides and destroys a military submarine led by Taylor's commanding officer from his time in the Navy.

Jonas and Tanaka realize that the female megalodon is pregnant and are determined to capture her before she gives birth. Maggie seizes this opportunity to advance her career and decides to film the shark from within a shark cage as she swims to California to give birth. During her sojourn north, the shark gives birth to three pups, one of which she devours and the second of which is killed by orcas. At the Farallon Islands, Maggie uses a dead whale to attract the shark, succeeding in filming it, but inadvertently causes it to attack her cage. Despite his best efforts, Jonas cannot stop the shark and rescue Maggie, leading to the creature devouring her as she tries to escape.

Jonas and Tanaka track down the female after she attacks a whale-watching boat shortly after. After tranquilizing the shark and capturing her, Taylor's vengeful superiors and Maggie's lover try to kill the shark with a homemade depth charge, causing the shark to awaken and rampage, killing dozens of witnesses and bystanders, including Taylor's superiors themselves. While the megalodon is rampaging, Jonas pilots a submersible down her throat and into her stomach, where he uses the hydrogen supply from his sub to ignite the whale blubber inside the shark's stomach, burning it from the inside out, and after escaping from his pod, Jonas is rescued by Terry and a passing tourist vessel. The survivors in Jonas and Tanaka's crew capture the last surviving Megalodon pup as Jonas is taken away to be treated for decompression sickness from his fight with the adult shark and are excited about the opportunity to study this believed-extinct creature in the flesh. The young megalodon is later named Angel: The Angel of Death.

Sequels
The novel spawned a series with these sequels:
The Trench (1999)
Meg: Primal Waters (2004)
Meg: Hell's Aquarium (2009)
Meg: Origins (2011)
Meg: Nightstalkers (2016)
Meg: Generations (2020)
Meg: Purgatory (2023)

Film

A film based on the novel had been mired in development hell since 1997. At one point, reports surfaced that the film was slated for a 2008 release date and was to be made by New Line Cinema, which had recently bought the rights from Alten. Names that were attached to the project included Jan de Bont and Guillermo del Toro. However, in July 2007, New Line canceled the production. Steve Alten had said that once his relationship with New Line was finally over, he would be taking the property elsewhere. The rights eventually reverted to Alten, but the film remained in development hell.

In 2011, Alten commented on his sparsely updated website. Along with the announcement that he would be releasing a prequel novella titled Meg: Origins, Alten indicated that he was holding back the release of his next entry in the series Meg: Night Stalkers to time with the release of the film. On January 2, 2015, Alten appeared on Coast to Coast AM radio with George Noory and said that a film based on Meg was back on track.

On June 16, 2015, Eli Roth was announced to direct the film adaptation. He left the project due to creative differences. On March 3, 2016, ComingSoon.net reported that director Jon Turteltaub (National Treasure) has since been in talks to helm the movie adaptation of Steve Alten's Meg.

On April 14, 2016, various media outlets reported that action star Jason Statham would be taking the lead role of Jonas Taylor in the upcoming film. In July 2016, Jessica McNamee and Ruby Rose also joined the cast of the film.

The film was initially due to be released on March 2, 2018, but was ultimately released on August 10, 2018.

References

External links
Meg novel homepage
Belle Avery Talks the Long-delayed 'Meg'!

1997 American novels
Fictional sharks
Meg series
Novels by Steve Alten
American science fiction novels
Novels set in Oceania
American novels adapted into films
A Novel of Deep Terror